Darnell Mooney (born October 29, 1997) is an American football wide receiver for the Chicago Bears of the National Football League (NFL). He played college football at Tulane.

High School career 
Darnell Mooney went to Gadsden City High School in Gadsden, Alabama. Mooney played football and basketball for the Gadsden City Titans.

College career
At Tulane, Mooney led the Green Wave in receiving in both his junior and senior seasons. He caught 48 passes each year, totaling 993 yards in 2018 and 713 yards in 2019. Mooney scored 19 touchdowns in his college career. At the NFL draft combine, Mooney ran a 40-yard dash time of 4.38 seconds.

Professional career

Chicago Bears
Mooney was selected by the Chicago Bears with the 173rd pick in the fifth round of the 2020 NFL Draft. He signed a four-year rookie contract with the team on July 21.

In his NFL debut, a 27–23 victory over the Detroit Lions, Mooney caught three passes from Mitchell Trubisky for 38 yards. He scored his first touchdown the following week when he caught a 15-yard pass against the New York Giants. In Week 15 against the Minnesota Vikings, Mooney caught four passes and a touchdown; the former elevated his season reception total to 46, enabling him to set the Bears franchise record for the most catches by a rookie, passing Harlon Hill's 45 in 1954. Week 17 against the rival Packers, Mooney had his best game of his rookie season, catching 11 passes for 93 yards. Mooney sustained an ankle injury near the end of the Packers game, which forced him to miss the Bears' playoff game against the New Orleans Saints.

For the 2021 season, Mooney caught 81 passes for 1,055 yards and four touchdowns. His best performance came in the last game where Mooney caught 12 passes for 126 yards.

In 2022, Mooney started the first 12 games before suffering an ankle injury in Week 12. He was placed on injured reserve on November 29, 2022.

NFL career statistics

References

External links
Chicago Bears bio
Tulane Green Wave bio
Darnell Mooney on Instagram

1997 births
Living people
Players of American football from Alabama
Sportspeople from Gadsden, Alabama
American football wide receivers
Tulane Green Wave football players
Chicago Bears players
Brian Piccolo Award winners